John Ruthven Lawrie (11 September 1900 – 7 July 1981) was a rugby union flanker who played 11 times for Scotland between 1922 and 1924.  He played his club rugby for Leicester Tigers and Melrose.

Lawrie made his international debut for Scotland on 2 January 1922 against France at Colombes.  In 1923 Lawrie transferred to Leicester making his debut on 1 September 1923 against Bath. On 2 February 1924 Lawrie played for Scotland against Wales and became the first non-English Leicester player selected for international duty.

Sources
Farmer,Stuart & Hands, David Tigers-Official History of Leicester Football Club (The Rugby DevelopmentFoundation )

References

1900 births
1981 deaths
Scottish rugby union players
Scotland international rugby union players
Rugby union players from Melrose, Scottish Borders
Leicester Tigers players
Melrose RFC players
Rugby union flankers